Frank M. Pelly (born August 3, 1933) is an American politician who served in the New Jersey General Assembly from the 18th Legislative District from 1982 to 1991.

In May 1991, Pelly was named by Governor James Florio to serve as executive director of the New Jersey Lottery, after Pelly announced that he would not be seeking re-election.

References

1933 births
Living people
Democratic Party members of the New Jersey General Assembly
People from New Brunswick, New Jersey
Politicians from Middlesex County, New Jersey